Ellis v. United States may refer to:

 Ellis v. United States (1907), 206 U.S. 246 
 Ellis v. United States (1958), 356 U.S. 674, decided by the Warren Court
 Ellis v. United States (1969), 16 F.2d 791

Ellis_v._United_States_(Disambiguation)